Pau Football Club (Bearnese ), known simply as Pau, is a French professional association football club based in Pau, Pyrénées-Atlantiques, capital of Béarn. They compete in Ligue 2, the second tier of French football.

Pau FC were founded in 1920 as Bleuets de Notre-Dame de Pau, although their official founding date is in 1959, when Football Club de Pau were first formed. Bleuets de Notre-Dame joined the highest amateur league in France in 1958 after success in the French South-West League (Ligue du Sud-Ouest). However, the religious authorities argued that the football section had outgrown the rest of the club and financial support was withdrawn. As a consequence, José Bidegain, a local businessman, created the Football Club de Pau. In the early years after the club's formation in its original home of Pau, they played their home matches at many different grounds until finally settling at the Nouste Camp.

The club's achievements include winning the Championnat National in 2020, winning the National 2 title twice in 1998 and 2016 and winning the French South-West League in 1958 and 1968.

Pau FC have long-standing rivalries with several other clubs in Southern France in the Adour river basin. The most notable of these are Bayonne, Mont-de-Marsan and Tarbes. With the rise of Pau FC and the decline of Bayonne, Mont-de-Marsan and Tarbes, Pau recently became a strong rival to Bordeaux and both form the New Aquitaine derby.

History

Football in Pau and South-West France 
Since the Belle Époque, football had to play second fiddle to basketball and especially rugby union in Pau. Nowadays, the popularity of both Pau's rugby union and basketball clubs – Section Paloise and Élan Béarnais, respectively – remains greater than that of Pau FC.

Historically and culturally, rugby was probably closer to the values of the place (Gascony), replacing the Béarnese and Basque rural sports in the hearts of the people of Béarn and Gascony.

Recent history 
On 16 January 2020, Pau eliminated Ligue 1 side Bordeaux from the Coupe de France following a 3–2 victory.  Les Maynats went on to face national champions Paris Saint-Germain in the round of 16 of the cup, losing 2–0. Pau registered their highest attendance ever that day, with 16,707 persons witnessing the Parisian victory.

When the 2019–20 Championnat National season was prematurely ended due to the COVID-19 pandemic, Pau were top of the table, and were declared promoted to Ligue 2 by the FFF executive committee. In the 2020–21 season, the club placed fourteenth in Ligue 2.

Key dates 
1920: Foundation of Bleuets Notre-Dame de Pau.

1923: First football season of Bleuets Notre-Dame de Pau.

1951: French youth champion

1956: Reached the top level of the French South-West regional football league.

1958: Champion of the French South-West regional football league. Promotion to the third tier of French football.

1959: Football Club de Pau split from Bleuets de Notre-Dame de Pau.

1995: The club went to administration, reformed, changed their name to Pau Football Club and were relegated to the fourth tier of French football.

1998: Champion of the Group C of the Championnat de France Amateur and promoted to the Championnat National. The club also reached the round of 16 of the Coupe de France, where they lost 2–0 to Paris Saint-Germain.

2008: Relegation to the Championnat de France Amateur.

2016: Promotion to the Championnat National.

2020: Promotion to Ligue 2.

Colours and badge 

For the 2022–23 season, the club decided to update their logo. Their new crest has a round shape and gathers many symbols of Béarn and the city of Pau: the Pyrenees mountain range, the Pic du Midi d'Ossau and the two cows that feature on the province of Béarn's flag.

There are various references to the coat of arms of the city of Pau such as King Henry IV's crown, the three posts that gave the city its name (pau  in Béarnese) and the peafowl, a clear example of canting arms, as its name (pavon or pau  in Béarnese) was used as an approximation to represent the city of Pau.

Coaching & Medical Staff

Current squad

Out on loan

References 

 
Association football clubs established in 1920
Sport in Pau, Pyrénées-Atlantiques
1920 establishments in France
Football clubs in Nouvelle-Aquitaine